Probe Plus was a record label based in Liverpool, England. It was founded by Geoff Davies, an enthusiastic promoter of small, unsigned bands, who describes the label as "Music to drive you to drink".

History
The label was started in May 1981, its first release being the self-titled debut EP by local electronic band Ex Post Facto. For years the label was based in an office above the Probe Records shop in Rainford Gardens. Due to a change in building ownership both the shop and label were forced to move and Davies set up office in his house. After marrying Anne in 1999, they moved house and he continued to run the label from there.

Probe Plus has a number of bands to their name including Kelso, Dead Poppies and Marlowe. In 1990, the label released "Colours", the first single by No-Man, who later signed to One Little Indian and Epic/Sony.

The label is perhaps best known for Half Man Half Biscuit, who were signed from 1985 until the end of the label. Davies signed the group on the basis of a tape they gave to him, saying "I thought that if the tape was half as good as the titles then I'd want to record this group". The band's debut album sold over 50,000 copies, enabling Davies to plough money back into the label.

Probe Plus were later home to a number of Welsh bands, including Fflaps who released a Welsh-language album on the label.

Many of the label's releases are produced by Davies and Sam Davis under the pseudonym 'The Bald Brothers'.

In 2021, Davies announced his retirement and the closure of the label with Half Man Half Biscuit announcing they will move to self-releasing their future material.

Probe Plus artists
Probe Plus have released records by artists including:

Attila the Stockbroker
Betrayal 
Brenda and the Beachballs
Cyclic Amp
Dead Poppies
Dog Flambé 
The Doonicans 
Ex Post Facto
The Farm
Fflaps
Gone to Earth 
Half Man Half Biscuit
jd meatyard
Jegsy Dodd
Levellers 5
Lovecraft
The Magic Carpets
Mel-O-Tones
No-Man
The Onset - featured Mike Badger and Paul Hemmings formerly of The La's
Ophiuchus
Poisoned Electrick Head
Pressure Drop 
Public Disgrace
Sik Lizards
St. Vitus Dance 
Surreal Estate (who included Will Sergeant and Les Pattinson of Echo & the Bunnymen)
The Tansads
The Tractors
The Tunnel Frenzies
The Walking Seeds

See also 
 List of record labels

References

External links
 http://www.probe-plus.co.uk/

British record labels
Indie rock record labels